Ratzeburgia is a genus of plants in the grass family.

Species
The only known species is Ratzeburgia pulcherrima, found only in Myanmar.

Formerly included
see Elionurus
Ratzeburgia schimperi - Elionurus royleanus

References

External links
Grassbase - The World Online Grass Flora

Andropogoneae
Monotypic Poaceae genera
Endemic flora of Myanmar
Grasses of Asia